He or Ei (asomtavruli , nuskhuri , mkhedruli ჱ) is the 8th letter of the three Georgian scripts.

In the system of Georgian numerals it has a value of 8. Now obsolete in Georgian language.

Letter

Stroke order
Direction of writing:
Asomtavruli: Go from left up, right, and down.
Nuskhuri: Go from left up, right, and down.
Mkhedruli: Go from left up, right, and down.

Computer encodings

See also
He (letter)

References

Bibliography
Mchedlidze, T. (1) The restored Georgian alphabet, Fulda, Germany, 2013
Mchedlidze, T. (2) The Georgian script; Dictionary and guide, Fulda, Germany, 2013
Machavariani, E. Georgian manuscripts, Tbilisi, 2011
The Unicode Standard, Version 6.3, (1) Georgian, 1991-2013
The Unicode Standard, Version 6.3, (2) Georgian Supplement, 1991-2013

Georgian letters